Nika Sandokhadze (20 February 1994) is a Georgian professional footballer who plays as a defender for Locomotive Tbilisi on loan from FC Dinamo Tbilisi.

Honours
Torpedo Kutaisi
Georgian Cup: 2022

Dinamo Tbilisi
Erovnuli Liga: 2020

Saburtalo Tbilisi
Georgian Cup: 2019

Samtredia
Erovnuli Liga: 2016
 Georgian Super Cup: 2017

References

External links

Karpaty Lviv official Profile

1994 births
Living people
Footballers from Georgia (country)
Georgia (country) under-21 international footballers
FC Dinamo Tbilisi players
FC Torpedo Kutaisi players
FC Lokomotivi Tbilisi players
FC Samtredia players
FC Karpaty Lviv players
Ukrainian Premier League players
Expatriate footballers from Georgia (country)
Expatriate footballers in Ukraine
Expatriate sportspeople from Georgia (country) in Ukraine
FK RFS players
Expatriate sportspeople from Georgia (country) in Latvia
Expatriate footballers in Latvia
FC Saburtalo Tbilisi players
Association football central defenders
Footballers from Tbilisi
Erovnuli Liga players